Ceylonthelphusa cavatrix is a species of decapod in the family Gecarcinucidae.

The IUCN conservation status of Ceylonthelphusa cavatrix is "EN", endangered. The species faces a high risk of extinction in the near future. The IUCN status was reviewed in 2017.

References

Further reading

 

Ceylonthelphusa
Articles created by Qbugbot
Crustaceans described in 1998